The Platzer MA 12 P/Nissan is a German aircraft engine, produced by Michael Platzer of Guxhagen for use in ultralight aircraft.

Design and development
The engine is a four-cylinder four-stroke, in-line,  displacement, liquid-cooled, automotive conversion gasoline engine design, with a poly V belt reduction drive with a reduction ratio of 2.6:1. It employs a magneto ignition system and produces  at 5600 rpm, with a compression ratio of 10.3:1.

Specifications (Platzer MA 12 P/Nissan)

See also

References

Platzer aircraft engines
Liquid-cooled aircraft piston engines
2010s aircraft piston engines